Huteng (also 胡腾舞, Húténgwǔ, "Dance of the Barbarian leap") was the Chinese term for a type of dance that originated in Central Asia, especially among the Sogdians and the region of Tashkent (石國, Shíguó). The dance was well known during the Tang dynasty, and there are numerous depictions of it in works of art. The dance was characterized by spinning, leaps and backflips. The dancers would particularly make summersaults, first planting their feet firmly on the carpet, tilting their face upward and arching their body, then lift their arms and jump backward to the sound of flutes and the pipa.

Another famous dance from Central Asia was the Sogdian Whirl (胡旋, Húxuăn, "Whirling Barbarian", also 胡旋舞, Húxuănwǔ, "Dance of the Whirling Barbarian", sometimes rendered as "Whirling barbarian" but known as "Sogdian Whirl dance" or simply "Sogdian whirl" to Western scholars), in which a young woman was spinning inside a circle. Also another one was the "Dance of the thorn branch" (柘枝舞, Zhèzhīwŭ).

These dances, part of the "Barbarian dances" (胡舞, Húwŭ)  from Central Asia, Serindia and the Persian Empire, were extremely popular in China during the Tang Dynasty, especially in the area of Chang'an and Luoyang. 

The representations of foreigners would turn more negative after the 8th century CE, following the revolt of An Lushan, a Turco-Iranian rebel.

Gallery

See also
 Sogdian Whirl dance
 Dance in China
 Dunhuang dance
 Iranians in China
 Tomb of Yu Hong

References

External links
 Huxuan dance (video)

Sui dynasty
Tang dynasty
Sogdians
Asian dances